"California Gurls" is a song recorded by American singer Katy Perry. It served as the lead single for her third studio album, Teenage Dream (2010). The song features verses from rapper Snoop Dogg. The artists co-wrote the song with Bonnie McKee and its co-producers Dr. Luke and Max Martin, with additional production from Benny Blanco. According to Perry, "California Gurls" is an answer song to "Empire State of Mind" (2009), by Jay-Z and Alicia Keys. Its mid-tempo production incorporates disco-pop and funk-pop with influences of new wave and electropop. Its lyrics are an ode to the state of California, in which both Perry and Snoop Dogg were born and raised.

"California Gurls" garnered positive reviews from music critics, with the majority of them labeling it a "summer anthem", as well as complimenting its production and chorus. Originally, the song was intended to be sent to mainstream and rhythmic airplay on May 25, 2010, the song debuted on May 7, 2010, after clips from the Teenage Dream album were leaked online. It was subsequently released to iTunes on May 11, 2010, as the album's lead single. The song was a worldwide success, peaking at number-one on the Billboard Hot 100 for six consecutive weeks, giving Perry her second number-one single in the US and Snoop Dogg his third. The song also reached number-one in seven other countries, was the best-selling song of 2010 in Canada, and is certified Platinum or higher in nine countries, including 4× Platinum in Canada, 6× Platinum in Australia, and 8× Platinum in the US.

A music video for the song was released on June 15, 2010, featuring Perry and her dancers as pieces of a board game, set in the fictional "Candyfornia". Perry has said that the inspiration behind the video was artist Will Cotton, who was also the artistic director of the video. It has also been noted that the video was influenced by several other works, including Charlie and the Chocolate Factory, Alice's Adventures in Wonderland, and the board game Candyland. On December 2, 2010, the song received a Grammy nomination for Best Pop Collaboration with Vocals. In 2012, Billboard ranked the song number one on a special The 30 Summer Songs of All Time listing.

Background

In an interview with HitQuarters, Perry's A&R at the time, Chris Anokute, said that while travelling back from an Oscar after-party, Perry texted him to say she did not think the album was finished and that it needed one more song. She said that she wanted to write a song about California girls. During a Rolling Stone photo shoot in April 2010, Perry revealed details about the song, reportedly a response to Jay-Z's "Empire State of Mind", she stated:

Perry used Wikipedia to research which rapper she wanted to collaborate with for "California Gurls", browsing West Coast artists before selecting Snoop Dogg. Initially, the song was going to be titled "California Girls". The spelling was changed to "California Gurls" after the death of Big Star member Alex Chilton as a nod to their song, "September Gurls". Rondor Music, the company that owns the publishing rights to the Beach Boys' "California Girls", allegedly threatened a lawsuit due to the lyric "I wish they could all be California Girls", a line that was taken from the Beach Boys' song.

After the song was leaked online, Capitol Records decided to release it early, and it was posted on Perry's official website, and the radio date was moved up from May 25, 2010, to May 7, 2010.

Composition
"California Gurls" is composed in styles of disco-pop, funk-pop and bubblegum pop while bearing influence of new wave music and electropop within its composition. According to digital sheet music published at Musicnotes.com by Sony-ATV Music Publishing, the song is written in the key of F major and the tempo moves at 125 beats per minute over a house beat. Perry's vocal range in the song spans from the lower note of C4 to the higher note of D5. "California Gurls" utilizes multiple synths, drums, funk guitars, and electronic whooshes in its production.

Critical reception

"California Gurls" received widespread critical acclaim. The song was given five stars from Nick Levine of Digital Spy who commended Perry's "charismatic" vocals on the song as well as its "unstoppable pop chorus". Leah Greenblatt of Entertainment Weekly and Katie Hasty of HitFix called it "the summer jam" of 2010. Rob Sheffield of Rolling Stone said that the song sets the tone for Teenage Dream. Chris Richards of The Washington Post praised the song, calling it "fresh" and "fierce". He commended the expertise of the song's arrangement and its "buoyant" chorus. Richards went on to say that "California Gurls" is "an ever-lasting gobstopper of a tune" and that "summertime megahits rarely feel this good". Musician Brian Wilson, who had co-written the Beach Boys' "California Girls", commended Perry's vocal on her song and described its melody as "infectious".

Glenn Gamboa of Newsday reviewed the song saying, "'California Gurls' is a fizzy-pop concoction of empty calories, but it sure does stick with you." He went on to note that the craftsmanship of the song was of a high standard. Steve Leftridge of PopMatters called "California Gurls" the radio jam of the summer of 2010 and "the gargantuan singalong fantasy that delivered on the promise built by the disco thump of hits like 'I Kissed a Girl' and 'Hot n Cold'." Leftridge also praised the song's musical composition, lyrical content and chorus which he said "you know by heart halfway through your first listen." The track was deemed as a highlight on Teenage Dream by Stephen Thomas Erlewine of AllMusic. Michael Cragg of musicOMH praised the song, "First single California Gurls is brilliant, brattish fun, Perry sounding sweet and coy on the verses before that huge chorus erupts". Edna Gundersen of USA Today said that the track is "an effervescent toast to summer fun." In a negative review, Greg Kot of Chicago Tribune dismissed the song as "relentlessly mechanical". He went on to describe Perry's vocal performance on the song as "a series of syllables digitally stitched together." The single received a Grammy nomination for Best Pop Collaboration with Vocals. On May 25, 2012, Billboard ranked the song number one on a special The 30 Summer Songs of All Time listing.

Chart performance

"California Gurls"  sold 294,000 digital downloads in its first week and debuted at number one on the US Billboard Digital Songs chart. It debuted at number two on the Billboard Hot 100, making it Perry's highest debut on the chart at the time. On the issue dated June 19, 2010, the song reached number one, becoming Perry's second number-one song and Snoop Dogg's third. "California Gurls" became the first single by an artist signed to Capitol Records in nearly 43 years to ascend to the number-one spot on the Billboard Hot 100 in its fourth week since Bobbie Gentry's single "Ode to Billie Joe" reached the top after four weeks on the chart. It is Perry's third number one on the Pop Songs chart. "California Gurls" became the first song to top the 300,000 mark in digital sales more than once in 2010 with 318,000 and 359,000 copies sold in the first and second week of June, respectively. Within seven weeks of its release, "California Gurls" sold over two million downloads, which is the second fastest pace to do so in digital history behind Flo Rida's "Right Round". It debuted at number 31 on the Billboard Radio Songs chart and in the July 10, 2010, issue it reached number one on the magazine's Hot Dance Airplay chart, giving Perry her second number-one single on that chart. As of August 2020, the song has been certified 8 times platinum by the Recording Industry Association of America (RIAA) and sold 5.9 million copies in the US.

Elsewhere, "California Gurls" reached number one in Canada and debuted in the top 20 in Belgium (Flanders and Wallonia), New Zealand and Norway. On May 24, 2010, "California Gurls" debuted on the Australian Singles Chart at number three, and later reached the number-one spot. On the RIANZ Top 10 Radio Airplay Charts, the song came in at number one in New Zealand and also received Gold certification from Recording Industry Association of New Zealand (RIANZ). "California Gurls" entered the UK Singles Chart on June 27, 2010, at number one, becoming her second chart-topper in the country. The single sold 123,607 copies in the UK in its first week (the second highest number in 2010 after the Helping Haiti charity single "Everybody Hurts"). After two weeks, the song sold 216,000 copies in the UK. On October 29, 2010, the British Phonographic Industry classified the single as a "platinum record" (meaning it has sold over 600,000 units). As of October 2013, the single had sold 780,787 copies in the United Kingdom, becoming Perry's third best-selling single there behind "Firework" and "Roar".

Music video

The video was directed by Mathew Cullen and was inspired by the work of Will Cotton, who was also the artistic director of the video. Filming of the video began on May 14, 2010. It premiered on June 15, 2010. Perry explained the use of a candy theme instead of a beach theme for the video, saying, "It's definitely something to watch when you have the munchies. ... It's all edible. We named it 'Candyfornia' instead of 'California', so it's a different world," she said. "It's not just like, 'Oh, let's go to the beach and throw a party and then shoot a music video!' It's more like, 'Let's put us California Gurls in a whole different world!" The video has been controversial since there were several accusations of plagiarism against Perry, one due to similarities between the video and "Fergalicious" by Fergie, particularly in the sets and the outfits.

In the music video, Perry is a game piece in Candyfornia, a game based in poker and board games. The settings are inspired in part by Alice's Adventures in Wonderland, Charlie and the Chocolate Factory, and the board game Candy Land, with much of the set decorated with cupcakes, ice creams, cotton candy, and lollipops. Snoop Dogg, who is referenced in the lyrics by his old name Snoop "Doggy" Dogg, appears in the video as a king named "Sugar Daddy" that is holding several young women (Queens of Candyfornia) captive throughout the game, using candy-related devices to hold them. Perry moves around, experimenting with objects. She moves through the land, making discoveries and freeing the women. In the chorus, she appears lying down on a cotton candy cloud, naked. Snoop Dogg tries to block her advances in many ways. When all the women are free, Perry leads them in a dance on the beach. Seeing the women freed, "Sugar Daddy" becomes enraged, marching on the women's position with an army of gummy bears. Perry defeats the army with whipped cream guns attached to her breasts, after which the stunned king throws down his staff and surrenders. The video ends with "Sugar Daddy" buried up to his neck in the sand by the women, nonetheless admiring their beauty and (in a nod to the Beach Boys song) wishing that women everywhere could be California girls. Various California landmarks appear in the video, such as the Hollywood Walk of Fame, the Hollywood Sign, Sunset Boulevard, the Capitol Records Building, the Golden Gate Bridge and Venice Beach which were all made out of confectionery.

Live performances

Perry performed the song on May 20, 2010, at the CW networks' annual "upfronts" presentation in New York. Perry performed the song at the 2010 MTV Movie Awards on June 6, 2010, alongside Snoop Dogg. She performed the song at the Le Grand Journal in Paris, on June 10, 2010, without Snoop Dogg. Perry also performed the song during her guest appearance on the September 25, 2010 episode of Saturday Night Live. Perry performed the song on The GRAMMY Nominations Concert Live! – Countdown to Music's Biggest Night on December 1, 2010. "California Gurls" was included as the encore for her California Dreams Tour. Perry performed California Gurls without Snoop Dogg on the BBC One chat show The Graham Norton Show on June 28, 2010.

On February 1, 2015, Perry was the headliner of Super Bowl XLIX halftime show and "California Gurls" was part of the performance.

Covers, samples, and media usage

The German cover band The Baseballs covered the song. It is included on their album Strings 'n' Stripes. The Hub has released a promo for the animated series My Little Pony: Friendship Is Magic. Entitled "Equestria Girls", it is set to the song's melody, with a new set of lyrics written specifically for the show and sung by Shannon Chan-Kent from the perspective of the character Pinkie Pie. A video clip of Cebu Pacific flight attendants performing a pre-flight safety demonstration as a dance routine to this song ended up as a viral YouTube video clip, attracting comment.

The parody song "G33k & G4m3r Girls" by Team Unicorn was released online in September 2010. The music video pays tribute to women who love gaming, manga, and science fiction. The video reached 1 million views in its first week online and stirred controversy over its sexy portrayal of geek girls.

Formats and track listings
Digital download
"California Gurls" (featuring Snoop Dogg) – 3:56

CD single
"California Gurls" (featuring Snoop Dogg) – 3:56
"Hot n Cold" (Yelle Remix) – 4:07

US digital download – remix EP
"California Gurls" (Armand Van Helden Remix) – 5:48
"California Gurls" (Innerpartysystem Main Mix) – 4:27
"California Gurls" (Manhattan Clique Long Beach Mix) – 7:00

UK digital download – remix EP
"California Gurls" (MSTRKRFT Main Mix) – 3:59
"California Gurls" (Innerpartysystem Main Mix)  – 4:27
"California Gurls" (Manhattan Clique Long Beach Mix)  – 7:00

Charts

Weekly charts

Monthly charts

Year-end charts

Decade-end charts

All-time charts

Certifications

Release history

See also

List of best-selling singles
List of best-selling singles in the United States
List of number-one singles in Australia in 2010
List of number-one pop hits of 2010 (Brazil)
List of Hot 100 number-one singles of 2010 (Canada)
List of European number-one hits of 2010
List of number-one singles in 2010 (Hungary)
List of number-one singles of 2010 (Ireland)
List of number-one singles in 2010 (New Zealand)
List of number-one singles of 2010 (Scotland)
List of number-one singles from the 2010s (UK)
List of number-one dance singles of 2010 (U.S.)
List of number-one dance airplay hits of 2010 (U.S.)
List of Billboard Hot 100 number-one singles of 2010
List of Hot Adult Top 40 Tracks number-one singles of 2010
List of Mainstream Top 40 number-one hits of 2010 (U.S.)
List of number-one singles of 2010 (Poland)

Notes

References

External links

2010 singles
Katy Perry songs
Snoop Dogg songs
Billboard Hot 100 number-one singles
Number-one singles in Australia
Canadian Hot 100 number-one singles
European Hot 100 Singles number-one singles
Irish Singles Chart number-one singles
Number-one singles in Poland
Number-one singles in Scotland
Record Report Pop Rock General number-one singles
UK Singles Chart number-one singles
Song recordings produced by Max Martin
Songs written by Katy Perry
Songs written by Max Martin
Songs written by Dr. Luke
Songs written by Snoop Dogg
Songs written by Mike Love
Songs written by Brian Wilson
Answer songs
Song recordings produced by Dr. Luke
Song recordings produced by Benny Blanco
Songs written by Bonnie McKee
2010 songs
Songs involved in plagiarism controversies
Songs about California